Moderna, Inc. is a pharmaceutical and biotechnology company based in Cambridge, Massachusetts that focuses on RNA therapeutics, primarily mRNA vaccines. These vaccines use a copy of a molecule called messenger RNA (mRNA) to carry instructions for proteins to produce an immune response. The company's name is derived from the  terms "modified", "RNA", and "modern".

The company's only commercial product is the Moderna COVID-19 vaccine, marketed as Spikevax. The company has 45 treatment and vaccine candidates, of which 38 have entered clinical trials. Candidates include possible vaccines for influenza, HIV, respiratory syncytial virus, Epstein–Barr virus, the Nipah virus, chikungunya, human metapneumovirus, varicella zoster virus, as well as a cytomegalovirus vaccine, a Zika virus vaccine funded by the Biomedical Advanced Research and Development Authority, and three cancer vaccines. The company's pipeline also includes a cell therapy-based treatment: a relaxin fusion protein being developed to treat acute decompensated heart failure. It also includes candidates that use OX40 ligand, interleukin 23, IL36G, and interleukin 12 for cancer immunotherapy,  specifically treatment of breast cancer, urothelial carcinoma, lymphoma, and melanoma. Also being developed by Moderna is a regenerative medicine treatment that encodes vascular endothelial growth factor A to stimulate blood vessel growth for patients with myocardial ischemia.

History
Moderna was founded in 2010 by Derrick Rossi, Timothy A. Springer, Kenneth R. Chien, Robert S. Langer, and Noubar Afeyan. Stéphane Bancel, the current CEO, was appointed as CEO in 2011. Between 2011 and 2017, Moderna raised $2billion in venture capital funding.

In 2013, the company formed a partnership with AstraZeneca to develop treatments for cardiovascular, metabolic, and renal diseases, as well as cancer, in 2015, the company formed a partnership with Merck & Co. to develop treatments for cancer, and in 2016 the company formed a partnership with Vertex Pharmaceuticals to develop treatments for cystic fibrosis. In January 2016, the Bill & Melinda Gates Foundation committed to provide at least $20 million in grant funding to the company. In July 2018, the company opened a 200,000 square foot facility in Norwood, Massachusetts for manufacturing, preclinical and clinical work. In December 2018, Moderna became a public company via the largest initial public offering of a biotechnology company in history, raising $621million by selling 27 million shares at $23 per share.

The first mRNA vaccine developed by Moderna was for influenza in 2015, and its first antibody encoded by mRNA was in 2019. In 2023, Moderna acquired OriCiro Genomics, a Japanese manufacturer of genetic engineering tools, in its first acquisition.

COVID-19 vaccine

From 2020-21, Moderna received $955million from Operation Warp Speed to accelerate development of its COVID-19 vaccine, with $4.9billion committed in total for producing 300 million vaccine doses. 

In March 2020, the Food and Drug Administration approved clinical trials for the Moderna COVID‑19 vaccine candidate, and in December, the vaccine, mRNA-1273, was issued an emergency use authorization in the United States. In 2022, it gained FDA approval both for the monovalent vaccine, Spikevax, and a bivalent booster.

In April 2022, Moderna announced plans to build a $180 million vaccine factory in Montreal, forming a 10-year partnership with the Government of Canada, Quebec, and McGill University to produce 100 million Spikevax doses annually and expand vaccine research capabilities.

In August 2022, Moderna sued Pfizer and BioNTech in both Massachusetts and Germany, alleging that the Pfizer–BioNTech COVID-19 vaccine violates the patent on Moderna's mRNA vaccine technology.

In 2023, the company agreed to pay $400 million to the National Institutes of Health, Dartmouth University, and Scripps Research to settle a dispute over the rights to a chemical technique that was used in the vaccine.

Financial data

See also
 DNA vaccine
 CureVac

References

External links

 
 

 
2010 establishments in Massachusetts
2018 initial public offerings
American companies established in 2010
Biotechnology companies of the United States
Biotechnology companies established in 2010
Companies based in Cambridge, Massachusetts
Health care companies based in Massachusetts
COVID-19 vaccine producers
Medical research
Pharmaceutical companies of the United States